Zhu Mingxin (born 16 May 1999) is a Chinese professional footballer who plays for Guangxi Pingguo Haliao, on loan from Changchun Yatai, as a defender.

Career statistics
.

References

1999 births
Living people
Chinese footballers
Changchun Yatai F.C. players
Jiangxi Beidamen F.C. players
China League One players
Association football defenders
Guangxi Pingguo Haliao F.C. players